Bristol Oakes is an unincorporated community in Alberta, Canada within Sturgeon County that is recognized as a designated place by Statistics Canada. It is adjacent to the designated places of Lower Manor Estates to the east, Upper and Lower Viscount Estates to the south, and Upper Manor Estates to the northwest.

Demographics 

See also 
List of communities in Alberta
List of designated places in Alberta

References 

Designated places in Alberta